The Hammond Wood Historic District is a national historic district located at Silver Spring, Montgomery County, Maryland.  It consists of 58 Contemporary single-family houses, built between 1949 and 1951, nestled in a tract of heavily wooded, rolling land. It is an intact, architecturally cohesive example of Charles Goodman's merchant builder subdivisions in Montgomery County.

It was listed on the National Register of Historic Places in 2004.

References

External links
, including photo in 2003, at Maryland Historical Trust website
Boundary Map of the Hammond Wood Historic District, Montgomery County, at Maryland Historical Trust

Historic districts on the National Register of Historic Places in Maryland
Historic districts in Montgomery County, Maryland
National Register of Historic Places in Montgomery County, Maryland